, also designated , is a magnitude-5.0 trans-Neptunian object that was discovered in 2011. Its orbital elements were very uncertain and it was lost.

References

External links 
 
 

Minor planet object articles (unnumbered)

Astronomical objects discovered in 2011